Francois Balloux is the director of the UCL Genetics Institute, and a professor of computational biology at University College London.

Early life and education 
Balloux earned a master's degree in 1996 and a doctorate in 2000 from the University of Lausanne. He then completed postdoctoral research at the University of Edinburgh.

Career
Balloux was an assistant professor at the University of Cambridge, between 2002 and 2007, before taking a position as an associate professor in infectious disease epidemiology at Imperial College London. In 2012, Balloux became a full professor at University College London.

Research 
Balloux's research lies at the interface of genomics, epidemiology, evolution and ecology. The main focus of his work is on the reconstruction of disease outbreaks and epidemics of human and wildlife pathogens, and the emergence of antimicrobial resistance. He has also engaged in research on the emergence and spread of drug resistance in tuberculosis, and Gram-negative bacteria, and the distribution of zoonotic pathogens in vertebrates.

Balloux and colleague Lucy van Dorp led the first large-scale sequencing project of the SARS-CoV-2 genome.

References

External links 
 

Living people
Academics of University College London
University of Lausanne alumni
Academics of Imperial College London
Computational biologists
21st-century biologists
Year of birth missing (living people)